James Herman Daves (August 5, 1890 – July 4, 1946) was a college football player.

College football
Daves was a guard and tackle for Dan McGugin's Vanderbilt Commodores of Vanderbilt University. He played on the 1912 and 1918 Vanderbilt teams, captain of the 1918 team. His play was praised during Vanderbilt's largest ever victory, a 105 to 0 over Bethel in 1912. Daves was selected All-Southern that year. He may have been All-Southern in 1918 as well. At Vanderbilt he was a member of Sigma Nu fraternity. His brother Oliver Daves was an All-Southern end for the Washington and Lee Generals in 1919.

References

American football guards
American football tackles
Vanderbilt Commodores football players
All-Southern college football players
Players of American football from Tennessee
1890 births
1946 deaths
People from Fayetteville, Tennessee